"The Others" is the first single by Australian rock music group Dukes of Windsor, taken from their debut album The Others.

Track listing

Remix version

"The Others" is a Dukes of Windsor song remixed by Australian electronic music duo TV Rock, which was released on 13 March 2007. It was one of the most played tracks on Australian radio in Spring 2007. The single was a top ten hit, the song also reached number one on Australia's ARIA Dance and Club charts.

Dukes of Windsor performed The Others with TV Rock at the MTV Australia Video Music Awards on 29 April 2007, in which they closed the show.

Track listing

Charts

Certifications

Release history

References

Dukes of Windsor songs
2006 singles
2007 singles
2006 songs
Sony BMG singles